Maalaiyitta Mangai is a 1958 Indian Tamil-language film directed by G. R. Nathan and produced by Kannadasan under his own production company Kannadasan Films. The film's soundtrack was composed by Viswanathan–Ramamoorthy. The film stars T. R. Mahalingam, Pandari Bai and Mynavathi, with Manorama (in her acting debut), Kaka Radhakrishnan and C. Lakshmi Rajyam in supporting roles. It is based on Sarat Chandra Chattopadhyay's novel Chandra Nath. The film was released on 27 June 1958 and became a success.

Plot 

Chandru studies in London and returns to Trichy. He lives with his aunt, Alankari and uncle and their daughter Kamalam. Kamalam is in love with Chandru but Chandru doesn't reciprocate it. Chandru goes to Madras to meet his friends family. There, he meets Sarasu and they fall in love. Sarasu is from a poor family. They both get married and he brings her to Trichy. Kamalam hates Sarasu in the beginning but when Sarasu is ready to give up her husband for Kamalam, she realises Sarasu's generous and gentle nature and they both become  close. Sarasu gets pregnant and during the bangle ceremony, Alankari gets a picture of Sarasu's mother, Chellam and tells everyone that Chellam became pregnant after her husband went to jail and she is characterless. Chandru's mind changes and he makes Sarasu leave the house to uphold his family values. Sarasu comes to Madras and finds that her mother is dead and her father is in jail again. She finds a letter written by her mother which says she got pregnant by her father who used to escape from jail and meet her at night and that they both run away to Madras. This letter proves her mother's character. Sarasu delivers a boy and Kamalam's marriage arrangements are made with Chandru. Kamalam chastises Chandru for throwing the pregnant Sarasu out and says he will be a man only if he brings her back. Chandru realises his mistake and goes to apologise to Sarasu. He meets with an accident and Sarasu donates her blood and nurses him back to health. Sarasu becomes weak and on her death bed unites Chandru and Kamalam and dies.

Cast 
 T. R. Mahalingam as Chandru
 Pandari Bai as Sarasu
 Mynavathi as Kamalam
 Manorama as Anjalai
 Kaka Radhakrishnan as Sudalai
 C. Lakshmi Rajyam
 Padmini Priyadarshini
 C. K. Saraswathi as Alankari

Production 
Maalaiyitta Mangai is an adaptation of the novel Chandra Nath by Sarat Chandra Chattopadhyay. The film marked the acting debut of Manorama. In an interview, she recalled that it was Kannadasan who insisted her to perform the comical role for the film as portraying such characters would cement her status in the industry.

Soundtrack 
Music was composed by Viswanathan–Ramamoorthy and all lyrics were written by Kannadasan. According to Scroll.in writer Sruthisagar Yamunan, the song "Engal Dravida Ponnade" was a "direct challenge to the Congress party's version of nationalism". Kannadasan wrote the song with Mahalingam singing, as a challenge in response to actor/politician M. G. Ramachandran's prediction that the film would fail because of his belief that Mahalingam would not be accepted as a lead actor by party cadres.

References

External links 
 

1950s musical drama films
1950s Tamil-language films
1958 films
1958 romantic drama films
Films based on works by Sarat Chandra Chattopadhyay
Films scored by Viswanathan–Ramamoorthy
Indian black-and-white films
Indian musical drama films
Indian romantic musical films